Arthur Edwin Cooke Watson (1870–1937) was an English footballer who played in the Football League for Notts County, with whom he was on the winning side in the 1894 FA Cup Final.

References

1870 births
1937 deaths
English footballers
Association football outside forwards
English Football League players
Mansfield Town F.C. players
Notts County F.C. players
FA Cup Final players